"C'mon Every Beatbox" is a song by English alternative dance band Big Audio Dynamite, released as both a 7" and 12" single from their second studio album, No. 10, Upping St. (1986). Written by Mick Jones and Don Letts, "C'mon Every Beatbox" was released as the lead single from the album, peaking at No. 51 on the UK Singles Chart, and No. 19 on Billboard's Dance Club Songs. The single features the non-album track, "Badrock City" as its B-side, which was later included as a bonus track on the US CD of the No. 10, Upping St. album.

Track listing
7" single
"C'mon Every Beatbox (Edit)"
"Badrock City"
Mixed by Sam Sever

12" single
"C'mon Every Beatbox (Extended Vocal Version)"
"Badrock City"
"Beatbox's at Dawn"
Mixed by Sam Sever

Chart performance

A"C'mon Every Beatbox and "Badrock City" charted together on the Billboard Hot Dance Club Play chart.
B"Badrock City" charted at No. 66 on the Hot Black Singles chart.

References

External links
 

1986 songs
1986 singles
Big Audio Dynamite songs
Songs written by Mick Jones (The Clash)
Song recordings produced by Mick Jones (The Clash)
CBS Records singles
Songs written by Don Letts